The Back River is a perennial river of the Mitchell River catchment, located in the Alpine region of the Australian state of Victoria.

Course and features
The river descends  over its  course.

References

External links

 
 
 

East Gippsland catchment
Rivers of Gippsland (region)